Delta Academy may refer to:

 Delta Academy (Mississippi) in Marks, Mississippi
 Central Delta Academy in Inverness, Mississippi
 Delta Streets Academy in Greenwood, Mississippi
 Delta Academy in El Paso, Texas
 Delta Academy in the Las Vegas Valley, Nevada

See also 
 Delta (disambiguation)